The Police and Criminal Evidence Act 1984 (PACE) (1984 c. 60) is an Act of Parliament which instituted a legislative framework for the powers of police officers in England and Wales to combat crime, and provided codes of practice for the exercise of those powers. Part VI of PACE required the Home Secretary to issue Codes of Practice governing police powers.  The aim of PACE is to establish a balance between the powers of the police in England and Wales and the rights and freedoms of the public. Equivalent provision is made for Northern Ireland by the Police and Criminal Evidence (Northern Ireland) Order 1989 (SI 1989/1341).  The equivalent in Scots Law is the Criminal Procedure (Scotland) Act 1995.

PACE has been modified by the Policing and Crime Act 2017, "which mean[s] that there is now a presumption that suspects who are released without charge from police detention will not be released on bail," a formality which was written in PACE 1984 Section 30A.

Synopsis
Although PACE is a fairly wide-ranging piece of legislation, it mainly deals with police powers to search an individual or premises, including their powers to gain entry to those premises, the handling of exhibits seized from those searches, and the treatment of suspects once they are in custody, including being interviewed. Specific legislation as to more wide-ranging conduct of a criminal investigation is contained within the Criminal Procedures and Investigation Act 1996.

Criminal liability may arise if the specific terms of the Act itself are not conformed to, whereas failure to conform to the codes of practice while searching, arresting, detaining or interviewing a suspect may lead to evidence obtained during the process becoming inadmissible in court.

PACE also introduces various Codes of Practice, one of the most notable being an arrest without warrant can only be lawful if the necessity test contained within Code G of PACE is met.

PACE was significantly modified by the Serious Organised Crime and Police Act 2005. This replaced nearly all existing powers of arrest, including the category of arrestable offences, with a new general power of arrest for all offences.

PACE is applicable not only to police officers but to anyone with conduct of a criminal investigation including Her Majesty's Revenue and Customs and to military investigations conducted by service police. Any person with a duty of investigating criminal offences or charging offenders is also required to follow the provisions of the PACE codes of practice as far as practical and relevant.

Despite its safeguards, PACE was extremely controversial on its introduction, and reviews have also been controversial, as the Act was thought to give considerable extra powers to the police.

With the conjunction of the Inland Revenue and HM Customs and Excise into Her Majesty's Revenue and Customs (HMRC), HMRC essentially gained extra powers since Customs and Excise had a statutory right of entry into a private dwelling, that is to say they were allowed to break and enter without reason, but the Inland Revenue did not. PACE and its subsequent enactments limits that.

Various other government agencies including TV Licensing, the Royal Mail, BT Group (from its days of being spun off from General Post Office Telephones) and about seventeen others also have a statutory right of entry. One intent of PACE and its successors is to prevent the abuse of this right, or remove it entirely, to balance the privacy of the individual against the needs of the State.

Background

The 1981 Brixton riots and the subsequent Scarman report were key factors in the passage of the Act, which was brought in following recommendations set out by the Royal Commission on Criminal Procedure. The purpose of PACE was to unify police powers under one code of practice and to balance carefully the rights of the individual against the powers of the police.

PACE Codes of Practice
The Home Office and the Cabinet Office announced a joint review of PACE and its codes of practice in May 2002, and on 31 July 2004, new PACE Codes of Practice came into effect. Following a further review in 2010, PACE Codes A, B and D were re-issued to take effect on 7 March 2011.
 PACE Code A: deals with the exercise by police officers of statutory powers to search a person or a vehicle without first making an arrest. It also deals with the need for a police officer to make a record of such a stop or encounter. On 1 January 2009, Code A was amended to remove lengthy stop and account recording procedures, requiring police to only record a subject's ethnicity and to issue them with a receipt.
 PACE Code B: deals with police powers to search premises and to seize and retain property found on premises and persons.
 PACE Code C: sets out the requirements for the detention, treatment and questioning of people in police custody by police officers. It replaced the Judges' Rules in England and Wales.
 PACE Code D: concerns the main methods used by the police to identify people in connection with the investigation of offences and the keeping of accurate and reliable criminal records.
 PACE Code E: deals with the tape recording of interviews with suspects in the police station.
 PACE Code F: deals with the visual recording with sound of interviews with suspects.
On 1 January 2006 an additional code came into force:
 PACE Code G: deals with statutory powers of arrest.
On 24 July 2006 a further code came into force:
 PACE Code H: deals with the detention of terrorism suspects.

Case law
In the case of Osman v. Southwark Crown Court (1999), the search of Osman was held to be unlawful because the officers searching him did not give their names and station, contrary to PACE's requirements.

In O'Loughlin v. Chief Constable of Essex (1997), the courts held that the entry of a premises under section 17 PACE to arrest O'Loughlin's wife for criminal damage was unlawful because under PACE, anyone present on the premises must be given the reason for entry.

In the case of Christopher James Miller v. Director of Public Prosecutions (2018) Mr. Miller's conviction for drug driving was revoked because West Midlands Police had breached Code C of PACE by not providing an appropriate adult, despite him telling officers that he had Asperger's syndrome and being aware from his previous interactions that he had Asperger's.

IPCC Investigation 2012/011560 - A breach of Code C of PACE occurred in 2012 when a vulnerable 11-year-old girl Child H with a neurological disability similar to autism who was denied an appropriate adult at Crawley Police Station, after she was arrested in Horsham on 4 separate occasions for minor offences between February and March 2012. Sussex Police referred the complaint to IPCC and accepted the IPCC recommendations.

However, not all cases have gone against the police; in R. v. Longman (1988), it was held that the police entry of a premises to execute a search warrant for drugs was lawful, although deception had been utilised to gain entry, and, upon entering, the police had not identified themselves or shown the warrant.

See also
 Computer forensics
 Police and Criminal Evidence (Northern Ireland) Order 1989

References

External links

Home Office: PACE Codes
O'Loughlin v Chief Constable Of Essex [1997] EWCA Civ 2891 (3 December 1997)

United Kingdom Acts of Parliament 1984
English criminal law
Law enforcement in England and Wales
Codes of criminal procedure
Law enforcement in the United Kingdom
Governance of policing in England
Governance of policing in Wales
 
Imprisonment and detention